Verkhnyaya Plavitsa is a rural locality (a selo) and the administrative center of Verkhneplavitskoye Rural Settlement, Verkhnekhavsky District, Voronezh Oblast, Russia. The population was 432 as of 2010. There are 9 streets.

Geography 
Verkhnyaya Plavitsa is located 26 km northeast of Verkhnyaya Khava (the district's administrative centre) by road. Maly Samovets is the nearest rural locality.

References 

Rural localities in Verkhnekhavsky District